Clover Township is a township in Hubbard County, Minnesota, United States. The population was 134 at the 2000 census.

Clover Township was named for the white clover growing within its borders.

Geography

Demographics
As of the census of 2000, there were 134 people, 61 households, and 43 families residing in the township. The population density was 4.0 people per square mile (1.5/km2). There were 138 housing units at an average density of 4.1/sq mi (1.6/km2). The racial makeup of the township was 100.00% White.

There were 61 households, out of which 21.3% had children under the age of 18 living with them, 60.7% were married couples living together, 4.9% had a female householder with no husband present, and 29.5% were non-families. 24.6% of all households were made up of individuals, and 13.1% had someone living alone who was 65 years of age or older. The average household size was 2.20 and the average family size was 2.60.

In the township the population was spread out, with 15.7% under the age of 18, 9.0% from 18 to 24, 13.4% from 25 to 44, 35.8% from 45 to 64, and 26.1% who were 65 years of age or older. The median age was 52 years. For every 100 females, there were 109.4 males. For every 100 females age 18 and over, there were 105.5 males.

The median income for a household in the township was $32,500, and the median income for a family was $43,750. Males had a median income of $27,500 versus $20,625 for females. The per capita income for the township was $17,723. There were 7.1% of families and 5.8% of the population living below the poverty line, including no under eighteens and 14.3% of those over 64.

References

Townships in Hubbard County, Minnesota
Townships in Minnesota